Happy Valley Chongqing is a theme park in Yubei District, Chongqing, China. It Opened on 8 July 2017, it is the seventh installation of the Happy Valley theme park chain.

Notable rides

References 

Chongqing
Buildings and structures in Chongqing
Tourist attractions in Chongqing
Buildings and structures under construction in China